Falaën is a village of Wallonia and a district of the municipality of Onhaye, located in the province of Namur, Belgium.

Falaën is a member of the Les Plus Beaux Villages de Wallonie ("The Most Beautiful Villages of Wallonia") association. Falaën Castle and the ruins of Montaigle Castle are located in the village.

References

External links

Former municipalities of Namur (province)